SAL Education are group of Seven institute in one Campus  at Ahmedabad, Gujarat, India. They were administered by Adarsh Foundation established in 2009. Adarsh Foundation is CSR arm of the Shah Alloys Limited, a major steel production company of India.

Technology and Engineering
SAL Institute of Technology and Engineering Research is a Self Financed Institute in Engineering, approved by All India Council for Technical Education, New Delhi and the Government of Gujarat. It provides best faculties and departments to support students. The Institutes are affiliated to the Gujarat Technological University, Ahmedabad. The Institute is offering bachelor's degree Engineering (B.E.) courses like Computer, Mechanical, EC, Civil, Electrical & Automobile Engineering. It is also offering PG Courses (M.E.) in Mechanical, Civil & EC Engineering. This Institute is headed by Principal Dr Rupesh Vasani.

Other
In SAL Campus there are six more institutes. One is SAL Institute of Management Second is SAL Institute of Pharmacy, Third is SAL College of Engineering, Forth is SAL Engineering & Technical Institute, Fifth is SAL School of Architecture and Sixth is SAL Institute of Diploma  Studies.

References

External links
 Official Website

Educational institutions established in 2009
Universities and colleges in Ahmedabad
2009 establishments in Gujarat